The Meuse–Argonne offensive (also known as the Meuse River–Argonne Forest offensive, the Battles of the Meuse–Argonne, and the Meuse–Argonne campaign) was a major part of the final Allied offensive of World War I that stretched along the entire Western Front. It was fought from September 26, 1918, until the Armistice of November 11, 1918, a total of 47 days. The Meuse–Argonne offensive was the largest in United States military history, involving 1.2 million American soldiers. It is also the deadliest battle in the history of the United States Army, resulting in over 350,000 casualties, including 28,000 German lives, 26,277 American lives and an unknown number of French lives. American losses were worsened by the inexperience of many of the troops, the tactics used during the early phases of the operation and the widespread onset of the global influenza outbreak called the "Spanish flu".

The offensive was the principal engagement of the American Expeditionary Forces (AEF) in World War I. It was one of a series of Allied attacks, known as the Hundred Days Offensive, which brought the war to an end. 
It was the largest and bloodiest operation of World War I for the AEF even if, given the scale of other battles on the Western Front, its size was limited and the operation itself secondary, being far from the main offensive axis.

Overview

The logistical prelude to the Meuse attack was planned by American then-Colonel George C. Marshall who managed to move American units to the front after the Battle of Saint-Mihiel (Saint-Mihiel is a town on the river Meuse, the most important water obstacle on the Western Front). The Allied breakthroughs (north, center, and east) across the length of the front line in September and October 1918 – including the Battle of the Argonne Forest – are now lumped together as part of what is generally remembered as the Grand Offensive (also known as the Hundred Days Offensive) by the Allies on the Western Front. The Meuse–Argonne offensive also involved troops from France, while the rest of the Allies, including France, Britain and its dominion and imperial armies (mainly Canada, Australia, and New Zealand), and Belgium contributed to major battles in more northwestern sectors of the Western Front, including the Hindenburg line.

After Operation Michael, the 1918 German offensive, began well but ended with the disaster of Reims in front of the French and at Amiens to British forces, The French and British armies systematically pushed back a German army whose efficiency was decreasing rapidly. British, French, and Belgian advances in the northwestern sectors of the front, along with the French–American advances around the Argonne Forest, are credited for leading directly to the Armistice of November 11, 1918. On September 26, the Americans began their strike north toward Sedan. The next day, British and Belgian divisions drove toward Ghent, Belgium. British and French armies attacked across northern France on September 28. The scale of the overall offensive, bolstered by the fresh and eager but largely untried and inexperienced U.S. troops, signaled renewed vigor among the Allies and sharply dimmed German hopes for victory.

The Meuse–Argonne battle was the largest frontline commitment of troops by the U.S. Army in World War I, and also its deadliest. Command was coordinated, with some U.S. troops (e.g. the Buffalo Soldiers of the 92nd Division and the 93rd Division) attached and serving under French command (e.g. XVII Corps during the second phase).

Prelude

Opposing forces

The American forces initially consisted of 15 divisions of the U.S. First Army commanded by General John J. Pershing until October 16 and then by Lieutenant General Hunter Liggett. The logistics were planned and directed by then Colonel George C. Marshall. The French forces next to them consisted of 31 divisions, including the Fourth Army (under Henri Gouraud) and the Fifth Army (under Henri Mathias Berthelot). The U.S. divisions of the AEF were oversized (12 battalions per division versus the French-British-German nine battalions per division), being up to twice the size of other Allies' battle-depleted divisions upon arrival, but the French and other Allied divisions had been partly replenished prior to the Grand Offensive, so both the U.S. and French contributions in troops were considerable. All of the heavy equipment (tanks, artillery, and aircraft) was provided by the Allies (mainly by the French Army). For the Meuse–Argonne front alone, this represented 2,780 artillery pieces, 380 tanks, and 840 planes.

Concerning armored support, the 35th Division was completed by the 1st Tank Brigade (under George S. Patton) with 127 American-crewed Renault FT light tank and 28 French-crewed Schneider medium tanks. The 3d US Tank brigade with 250 French-crewed tank was also involved supporting the V Corps. The 37th and 79th Division were augmented with a French tank regiment (Renault FT light tank) and 2 groups of medium tank (St-Chamond). The 91st Division was augmented with an equivalent force (1 light tank regiment and 2 groups medium tank).

As the battle progressed, both the Americans and the French brought in reinforcements. Eventually, 22 American divisions participated in the battle at one time or another, representing two full field armies. Other French forces involved included the 2nd Colonial Corps, under Henri Claudel, which had also fought alongside the AEF at the Battle of Saint-Mihiel earlier in September 1918.

The opposing forces were wholly German. During this period of the war, German divisions procured only 50 percent or less of their initial strength. The 117th Division, which opposed the U.S. 79th Division during the offensive's first phase, had only 3,300 men in its ranks. Morale varied among German units. For example, divisions that served on the Eastern front had high morale, while conversely divisions that had been on the Western front had poor morale. Resistance grew to approximately 200,000–450,000 German troops from the Fifth Army of Group Gallwitz commanded by General Georg von der Marwitz. The Americans estimated that they opposed parts of 44 German divisions overall, though many fewer at any one time.

Objective
The Allied objective was the capture of the railway hub at Sedan that would break the railway network supporting the German Army in France and Flanders.

Battle

First phase (September 26 – October 4, 1918)
"During the three hours preceding H hour, the Allies expended more ammunition than both sides managed to fire throughout the four years of the [American] Civil War. The cost was later calculated to have been $180 million, or $1 million per minute (about $3.5 billion in 2022 dollars)." The American attack began at 05:30 on September 26 with mixed results. The V and III Corps met most of their objectives, but the 79th Division failed to capture Montfaucon, the 28th "Keystone" Division's attack virtually ground to a halt due to formidable German resistance, and the 91st "Wild West" Division was compelled to evacuate the village of Épinonville though it advanced . The inexperienced 37th "Buckeye" Division failed to capture Montfaucon d'Argonne.

The subsequent day, September 27 most of the 1st Army failed to make any gains. The 79th Division finally captured Montfaucon and the 35th "Santa Fe" Division captured the village of Baulny, Hill 218, and Charpentry, placing the division forward of adjacent units. On September 29, six extra German divisions were deployed to oppose the American attack, with the 5th Guards and 52nd Division counterattacking the 35th Division, which had run out of food and ammunition during the attack. The Germans initially made significant gains, but were barely repulsed by the 35th Division's 110th Engineers, 128th Machine Gun Battalion, and Harry Truman's Battery D, 129th Field Artillery. In the words of Pershing, "We were no longer engaged in a maneuver for the pinching out of a salient, but were necessarily committed, generally speaking, to a direct frontal attack against strong, hostile positions fully manned by a determined enemy."

The German counterattack had shattered so much of the 35th Division—a poorly led division, most of whose key leaders had been replaced shortly before the attack, made up of National Guard units from Missouri and Kansas—that it had to be relieved early, though remnants of the division subsequently reentered the battle. Part of the adjacent French attack met temporary confusion when one of its generals died. Nevertheless, it was able to advance , penetrating deeply into the German lines, especially around Somme-Py (the Battle of Somme-Py) and northwest of Reims (the Battle of Saint-Thierry). The initial progress of the French forces was thus faster than the  gained by the adjacent American units, though the French units were fighting in a more open terrain, which is an easier terrain from which to attack.

Second phase (October 4–28, 1918)
The second phase began on October 4, when the first assault divisions (the 91st, 79th, 37th and 35th) were replaced by the 32nd, 3rd and 1st Divisions. The 1st Division created a gap in the lines when it advanced  against the 37th, 52nd, and 5th Guards Divisions. It was during this phase that the Lost Battalion affair occurred. The battalion was rescued by an attack by the 28th and 82nd Divisions (the 82nd attacking soon after taking up its positions in the gap between the 28th and 1st Divisions) on October 7. The Americans launched a series of costly frontal assaults that finally broke through the main German defenses (the Krimhilde Stellung of the Hindenburg Line) between October 14–17 (the Battle of Montfaucon). During the Battle of Montfaucon Missouri and Kansas National Guard soldiers were the first U.S. troops who tried to break through the stronghold of the Hindenburg Line at Côte de Châtillon but they were repulsed due to poor leadership. Next, the elite U.S. 1st Infantry Division tried and failed after suffering catastrophic casualties. The Rainbow Division (42nd Division) under Brigadier General Douglas MacArthur was finally able to take Côte de Châtillon after exposing a gap in the German defenses that was discovered by MacArthur's soldiers. This victory at Côte de Châtillon was considered the decisive turning point of the whole Meuse–Argonne offensive. By the end of October, U.S. troops had advanced ten miles and cleared the Argonne Forest. On their left the French had advanced twenty miles, reaching the Aisne River. It was during the opening of this operation, on October 8, that Corporal (later Sergeant) Alvin York made his famous capture of 132 German prisoners near Cornay. On October 23, notable injuries were sustained to Major Frank Cavanaugh as a result of enemy shellfire.

Third phase (October 28 – November 11, 1918)
By October 31, the Americans had advanced  and had cleared the Argonne Forest. On their left the French had advanced , reaching the River Aisne. The American forces reorganized into two armies. The First, led by General Liggett, moved to the Carignan-Sedan-Mezieres Railroad. The Second Army, led by Lieutenant General Robert L. Bullard, was directed to move eastward toward Metz. The two U.S. armies faced portions of 31 German divisions during this phase. The American troops captured German defenses at Buzancy, allowing French troops to cross the River Aisne, whence they rushed forward, capturing Le Chesne (the Battle of Chesne). In the final days, the French forces conquered the immediate objective, Sedan and its critical railroad hub (the Advance to the Meuse), on November 6 and American forces captured surrounding hills. On November 11, news of the German armistice put a sudden end to the fighting.

Image gallery

See also 
 List of military engagements of World War I
 Meuse-Argonne American Cemetery
 Meuse-Argonne American Memorial

References

Further reading

 
 
 
 
 
 
 Lengel, Edward G., ed. A Companion to the Meuse-Argonne Campaign (Wiley-Blackwell, 2014). xii, 537 pp.
 
 
 
 
 
 Yockelson, Mitchell. Forty-Seven Days: How Pershing's Warriors Came of Age to Defeat at the German Army in World War I (New York: NAL, Caliber, 2016)

External links 

Government
 Battlefield Experience: The Meuse–Argonne Offensive at American Battle Monuments Commission
 The Meuse–Argonne Offensive at U.S. National Archives and Records Administration
 The Meuse–Argonne Offensive Interactive at American Battle Monuments Commission
 This Day in History, September 26, 1918: The Meuse-Argonne Campaign Begins at American Battle Monuments Commission
General information
 Battles of the Meuse–Argonne at Encyclopædia Britannica Online
 
 Meuse–Argonne offensive at meuse-argonne.com
 
 

1918 in France
Battles of the Western Front (World War I)
Battles of World War I involving France
Battles of World War I involving Germany
Battles involving Thailand
Battles of World War I involving the United States
Conflicts in 1918
History of Grand Est
Hundred Days Offensive
September 1918 events
October 1918 events
November 1918 events
Military operations of World War I involving chemical weapons